M&M's Kart Racing is a racing video game for the Nintendo DS and Wii, based on the M&M's license and developed by Frontline Studios in co-production with Calaris Studios. Both studios responsible for this game’s development were headquartered in Poland. It is the 5th of the 7 M&M's video games. The game allows players to play one of M&M's characters in 15 race environments (Though is incorrectly stated as 10 on the back of the game's box).

The game was widely panned upon release and has been cited as one of the worst video games of all time.

Gameplay
M&M's Kart Racing is a kart racing game in which players control one of six selectable characters who race in karts in different race tracks that vary in shape and theme.

Players can choose from seven different race vehicles which can be customized in the M&M's garage. Races take place in street, dirt, ice and sandy environments which affect vehicle handling in different ways. There are cups of coffee placed on the ground around the tracks to give players a speed boost, resulting in the utterance of the infamous phrase: "Approaching sound barrier". The player can also pick up chocolate coins scattered across the raceway, but they have no purpose outside of arcade mode, where players must collect all the chocolate coins to proceed to the next raceway. To get a turbo boost at the start of a race, players must shake their Wii Remote. Unlike other racers, to turn their vehicle a player also must tilt the Wii Remote.

Reception

M&M's Kart Racing was critically panned upon release. It has a GameRankings score of 22.50% and 22.33% for the Wii and DS versions respectively.

IGN gave the DS version 3/10 and the Wii version 2.5/10 citing that "commercial mascots make terrible video games" and that the game "barely uses the license at all". GameSpot gave the DS version 2/10 stating that the game "could put you off M&M's for life". GameSpot also awarded the game "Flat-out Worst Game" award in GameSpot'''s "Best and Worst of 2008" awards. GameZone also panned it, giving it 2/10. The game was also awarded the lowest-rated kart game by Guinness World Records Gamer's Edition 2011, stating that the game's nearest "rival" was Shrek Swamp Kart Speedway, the latter of which has a GameRankings score of 26.40%, 3.9% more than M&M's Kart Racing.

Gameplay footage of the game was featured as Joystiq's "Today's most hilariously atrocious video", stating that the gameplay footage "is a true testament to the wrong way to build a kart racer". 

Gamesradar ranked the game 32nd on their "The 50 Worst Games of All Time." They criticized the Wii’s motion controls making the karts impossible to handle and the absence of items to use in races, saying most Mario Kart'' rip-offs include the use of items.

References

External links
Official Frontline Studios website

2007 video games
Advergames
Works based on advertisements
Racing video games
Wii games
Nintendo DS games
Kart racing video games
Video games developed in Poland
Destination Software games
Video games about food and drink
M&M's
Multiplayer and single-player video games
Frontline Studios games